Krudttønden (meaning "The powder keg") is a café and local cultural centre at Østerfælled Torv in the Østerbro district of Copenhagen, Denmark. Krudttønden is used for a wide array of cultural events, including theatre, concerts, debates, exhibitions and receptions.

History
Krudttønden was established in connection with the redevelopment of the former Østerfælled Barracks into a mixed-use development. It was established in 1990 by the Municipality of Copenhagen at the request of local artists and volunteers. The building is a former stables. It has later been expanded with a modern building.

2015 shooting

On 14 February 2015, the cafe was the site of a shooting attack that killed the 55-year-old film director Finn Nørgaard and wounded three police officers.

References

External links

 Official website

Coffeehouses and cafés in Denmark
Music venues in Copenhagen
Cultural and educational buildings in Copenhagen